Lay Your Hands on Me may refer to:

in music:
 "Lay Your Hands on Me," a song on Peter Gabriel's 1982 album Peter Gabriel (album also known as Security)
 "Lay Your Hands on Me" (Thompson Twins song), a song on Thompson Twins' 1985 album Here's to Future Days
 "Lay Your Hands on Me," a 1988 song and 1989 single by rock band Bon Jovi
 Lay Your Hands on Me  (album), a 1996 album by jazz saxophonist Art Porter, Jr.
 "Lay Your Hands on Me," a song on The Mission's 2001 album Aura
 "Lay Your Hands on Me," a song on Icehouse's 2002 remix album Meltdown
 "Lay Your Hands on Me," a song on Beth Hart's 2003 album Leave the Light On
 "Lay Your Hands on Me," a song on Lisa Stansfield's 2004 album The Moment
 "Lay Your Hands on Me"  (Boom Boom Satellites song), a 2016 song and EP by Boom Boom Satellites

other:
 "Lay Your Hands on Me" (Grey's Anatomy), a 2008 episode of the television series Grey's Anatomy